Spyridium tricolor is a species of flowering plant in the family Rhamnaceae and is endemic to southern continental Australia. It is an erect shrub with broadly elliptic to round leaves, and dense clusters of densely woolly-hairy, cream-coloured flowers.

Description
The flowers are cream-coloured, densely woolly-hairy and borne on the ends of branches in up to 3 clusters of 12 to 20 flowers on a branched rachis. Flowering occurs throughout the year.

Taxonomy
Spyridium tricolor was first formally described in 1993 by William Robert Barker and Barbara Lynette Rye in the Journal of the Adelaide Botanic Gardens from specimens collected by Paul G. Wilson, near Point Dover on the Great Australian Bight in 1967. The specific epithet (tricolor) means "three-coloured", referring to the leaves, pale to mid-green on the upper surface, rust-coloured at first, later grey on the lower surface.

Distribution and habitat
This spyridium grows in sandy soil with limestone, often in mallee shrubland between Cape Arid National Park and Eyre in Western Australia, and disjunctly near Ceduna in South Australia.

Conservation status
Spyridium tricolor is listed as "not threatened" by the Western Australian Government Department of Biodiversity, Conservation and Attractions.

References

tricolor
Rosales of Australia
Flora of Western Australia
Flora of South Australia
Plants described in 1993
Taxa named by Barbara Lynette Rye
Taxa named by William Robert Barker